Blood Cells, Molecules and Diseases is a peer-reviewed medical journal covering hematology. It was established in 1975 as Blood Cells and obtained its current title in 1995. The editor-in-chief is Mohandus Narla. It is published eight times per year by Elsevier.

Abstracting and indexing
The journal is abstracted and indexed in:

According to the Journal Citation Reports, the journal had a 2013 impact factor of 2.331, ranking it 39th out of 68 journals in the category "Hematology".

References

External links

Elsevier academic journals
Publications established in 1975
Hematology journals
English-language journals